Paul Zimmer may refer to:

 Paul Edwin Zimmer (1943–1997), American author and poet
 Paul Zimmer (poet) (born 1934), American poet and editor
 Paul Zimmer, automobile executive; founder of Zimmer (automobile)
 Paul Zimmer (internet personality) (born 1995), a Musical.ly (later TikTok) personality also known as "Troy Becker"

See also
 Zimmer (surname)
 Zimmer (disambiguation)
 Paul (disambiguation)
 Paul Zimmerman (disambiguation)